A gendarme is a member of a gendarmerie, although the word is often incorrectly used to refer to any French policeman.

Gendarme may also refer to:
 Gendarme (historical) (or gens d'arme), a French medieval or early modern cavalryman
 Gendarme (mountaineering), an isolated pinnacle of rock on a mountain peak or ridge

ru:Жандармерия